Eva L'vovna Gordon Broido (7 November 1876 – 15 September 1941) was a Russian revolutionary and educationalist. In 1917 she was, Secretary of the Central Committee of the Menshevik Party.

Life
Eva L'vovna was born in Švenčionys on 7 November 1876, the daughter of a timber merchant. She trained as a pharmacist. In 1895 and 1896 she travelled to Berlin, coming to know Social Democrats there. From 1896 to 1898 she was married to a Mr. Gordon, with whom she had two children. In 1899 she moved to Saint Petersburg and joined the Social Democratic movement there. She translated August Bebel's Women and Socialism into Russian in 1899–1900, and was a leading member of the illegal Social Democratic Worker's Library, publishing the leaflets of a faction known as the Socialist Group.
She married Mark Broido in 1902, having a son and two daughters with him.

She taught Mikhail Kalinin how to read and write. He went on to become the President of the Soviet Union.

She was exiled to Siberia from 1914 to 1917, taking two of her youngest children with her.

Sentenced to death by military tribunal in 1940, she was shot in September 1941. Posthumously rehabilitated.

Works
 Memoirs of a Revolutionary, Oxford: Oxford University Press, 1967. (Ed. and transl. by Vera Broido.)

References

1876 births
1941 deaths
People from Švenčionys
People from Vilna Governorate
Lithuanian Jews
Russian Social Democratic Labour Party members
Mensheviks
Jews executed by the Soviet Union
Jewish socialists
Soviet rehabilitations
Revolutionaries from the Russian Empire